Moussa Ouwo (born May 29, 1976 in Niger) is a Nigerien football defender. He has represented the Niger national football team.

References

1976 births
Living people
Nigerien footballers
Niger international footballers
Association football defenders
Expatriate footballers in Burkina Faso
AS SONABEL players
Nigerien expatriate sportspeople in Burkina Faso